Drujegang Gewog is a gewog (village block) of Dagana District, Bhutan. Drukgyegang is one of the villages of the district.

References 

Gewogs of Bhutan
Dagana District